Deramore may refer to:

Baron Deramore, of Belvoir in the County of Down, a title in the Peerage of the United Kingdom
Deramore Arms, Heslington, a suburban village and civil parish within the City of York, in North Yorkshire, England
Deramore High School or Balmoral High School, secondary school in Belfast, Northern Ireland
Richard de Yarburgh-Bateson, 6th Baron Deramore (1911–2006), British architect, writer of erotic fiction, and a peer of the United Kingdom
Thomas Bateson, 1st Baron Deramore (1819–1890), British peer and Conservative Party politician

See also
Dehram
Derham (disambiguation)
Derrymore (disambiguation)